Chionodes praecia is a moth in the family Gelechiidae. It is found in North America, where it has been recorded from Utah, North Dakota, Washington, Alberta and British Columbia.

References

Chionodes
Moths described in 1999
Moths of North America